Woodmill may refer to:
 Sawmill
 Woodmill, Southampton, a district of Swaythling, Southampton, England
 Woodmill High School, Dunfermline, Scotland
 Woodmill (band), A Dutch Country rock band
 Wood Mill, Woodley, Stockport, Cheshire

See too:
 Woods Mill in Sussex Wildlife Trust